E FM (88.3 FM) is a Colombo, Sri Lanka-based radio station. Tagged with the catchphrase "Your Lifestyle Station", E FM is one of the three radio channels (Shree FM and Ran FM) operated and managed by EAP Broadcasting Company Ltd., a subsidiary of the EAP Edirisinghe Group of Companies.

E FM broadcasts live at 88.3 MHz and is also simulcasted in Kandy at 93.2 MHz.

History and Music 

The station commenced broadcasting in Colombo and Kandy in December 1999. And on 14 September 2007, the station's official website, www.efm.lk, was launched.

E FM was relaunched in September 2007 as Your Lifestyle Station, and repositioned in 2008 as a 1980s music station before reverted to its "Your Lifestyle Station" slogan at the end of 2013 as it introduced new programming.

References

External links 
E FM 100.4 website
Programme Schedule and Radio Promotions
E FM DJ Profiles
Club E FM

 

Contemporary hit radio stations
English-language radio stations in Sri Lanka
EAP Networks
Mass media in Colombo